Ghani Yalouz (born 28 January 1968 in Casablanca, Morocco) is a French former wrestler who competed in the 1992 Summer Olympics, in the 1996 Summer Olympics, and in the 2000 Summer Olympics.

After his competitive career ended, Yalouz served as director of performance for the French Wrestling Federation and French Athletics Federation.
In 2017, he was appointed director of the INSEP, of which he is an alumnus.

Yalouz grew up in Besançon, and the city's indoor sports hall was renamed in his honor in 2017.

References

External links
 

1968 births
Living people
Sportspeople from Casablanca
Moroccan emigrants to France
Olympic wrestlers of France
Wrestlers at the 1992 Summer Olympics
Wrestlers at the 1996 Summer Olympics
Wrestlers at the 2000 Summer Olympics
French male sport wrestlers
Olympic silver medalists for France
Olympic medalists in wrestling
Medalists at the 1996 Summer Olympics